Ángel Chavarría Rivas (born June 18, 1991, in Mexico City) is a Mexican professional footballer who last played for Loros de la Universidad de Colima. He made his professional debut with Cruz Azul Hidalgo during an Ascenso MX defeat to Correcaminos UAT on 20 July 2012.

References

1991 births
Living people
Mexican footballers
Cruz Azul Hidalgo footballers
Loros UdeC footballers
Ascenso MX players
Liga Premier de México players
Tercera División de México players
Footballers from Mexico City
Association footballers not categorized by position